St. Marys River  is a small community in the Canadian province of Nova Scotia, located in the Municipality of the District of Staint Mary's in Guysborough County. It is named after the river of the same name.

References
St. Marys River on Destination Nova Scotia

Communities in Guysborough County, Nova Scotia
General Service Areas in Nova Scotia